The University of Michigan Rugby Football Club (UMRFC) is a rugby union club at the University of Michigan in Ann Arbor. The UMRFC currently plays in the Big Ten conference at the D1A level, the highest level of collegiate play under USA Rugby.

The Wolverines largely rely on talent drawn from within the United States; however, foreign students will often add valuable contributions while studying abroad in Ann Arbor.  Many players join with little or no previous experience in rugby. Despite this, the UMRFC has won a number of championships and produced several athletes that have gone on to play rugby at a professional level.

According to their Player Handbook, UMRFC's mission is "to develop upstanding student athletes and men through the sport of Rugby. To play the game with inspiration, cultivate a close knit family within the club, and promote commitment, discipline, and respect on and off of the field."  Reinforcing these values, the Wolverine's work a variety of community service and charity events.

History 
The team began as the Michigan Rugby Football Club, founded in 1959. The club was composed of U of M undergraduate students, graduate students, staff, and alumni as well as Ann Arbor community members, maintaining this composition for 40 years. In January 2000, the University of Michigan Rugby Football Club was formed and restricted to current undergraduate (and in some cases, graduate) students at U of M.

Club honors 
 Collegiate Rugby Championship Quarterfinalists: 2014, 2015
 Midwest championship and National Quarter-Finalist: 2007-2008
 Midwest Championship and National Semi-Finalist: 2004-2005
 Senior Men National Championship: 1995
 National Third Place: 1980

Results
Full results since 1959

See the current schedule at the team's official website.

Past and current captains and presidents

Notable alumni 
 Sequoyah Burke-Combs - Seattle Seawolves (Major League Rugby)
 Cole Van Harn - Seattle Seawolves (Major League Rugby)
 Peter Donnelly - professor of statistical science
 Harvey Schiller - sports executive
 Bob Woodruff - television journalist

See also 
 College rugby
 Division 1-A Rugby

References

External links
 

Rugby, men's
Rugby union in Michigan